Matías "Dino" Armas Lago (born 20 November 1941) is a Uruguayan theater director and writer.

Biography
Matías Armas was born in the Montevidean neighborhood of Villa del Cerro, where he lived until he was 20 years old. His parents were Matías Armas, a port worker of socialist extraction, and Nicanda Lago Méndez, a housewife. He owes the pseudonym "Dino" to his father, who started calling him that after the first name of an Italian footballer.

The neighborhood, the early years of his life, and his family have important presence in his written work. It was during his adolescence that he first approached a theater group that worked at the Rampla Juniors Fútbol Club in his neighborhood.

He studied teaching and worked for 30 years as a teacher of primary education, until he retired with the position of school director.

In 1965 his first work, En otro y último ardiente verano, won one of the first three prizes in a theater contest organized by the El Tinglado Theater.

He is one of the most prolific Uruguayan playwrights, and his works have been staged in Latin America, the United States, and Europe. The 2009 film El novio de la muerta is based on two of his plays: Sus ojos se cerraron (1992) and Mujeres solas.

Armas has produced and directed adaptations of texts by authors such as Prosper Mérimée, Saint-Exupéry, and Henry Miller. He is the author of more than 60 plays. In addition to directing them in person, they have also been directed by Elena Zuasti, Omar Varela, Carlos Aguilera, Gloria Levy, Lucila Irazábal, Lucía Sommer, Antoine Baldomir, Marcelino Duffau, and others.

He has won numerous prizes, such as the 1993  for best national author text for Se ruega no enviar coronas, the 2006 Silver  for career achievement, first prize in the unpublished theater-drama category of the Ministry of Education and Culture's 2011 Annual Literature Prizes for Ave Mater, the 2015 Florencio for 50-year career and in the comedy category for Sus ojos se cerraron, and the 2015  from the Uruguayan branch of B'nai B'rith. He has also received awards for plays for children.

Works

References

Further reading

External links
 Interview with Dino Armas, El País, 11 June 2016

1941 births
20th-century dramatists and playwrights
20th-century Uruguayan educators
21st-century dramatists and playwrights
21st-century Uruguayan educators
Living people
Uruguayan children's writers
Uruguayan dramatists and playwrights
Uruguayan educators
Uruguayan theatre directors
Writers from Montevideo